The 2001 Sultan of Selangor Cup (The Regent of Selangor's Cup) was played on 4 August 2001, at Shah Alam Stadium in Shah Alam, Selangor.

Match 
Source:

Players 

Source:

Veterans 
A match between veterans of two teams are also held in the same day before the real match starts as a curtain raiser.

References 

2001 in Malaysian football
Selangor FA
Sultan of Selangor Cup